Robert Henry Codrington (15 September 1830, Wroughton, Wiltshire – 11 September 1922) was an Anglican priest and anthropologist who made the first study of Melanesian society and culture. His work is still held as a classic of ethnography.

Codrington wrote, "One of the first duties of a missionary is to try to understand the people among whom he works," and he himself reflected a deep commitment to this value. Codrington worked as headmaster of the Melanesian Mission school on Norfolk Island from 1867 to 1887. Over his many years with the Melanesian people, he gained a deep knowledge of their society, languages, and customs through a close association with them. He also intensively studied "Melanesian languages", including the Mota language.

Bibliography of works by Codrington
 A Sketch of Mota Grammar. (1877). (full text from the Internet Archive).
 The Melanesian Languages. (1885). Oxford: Clarendon Press. (full text from the Internet Archive).
 The Melanesians: Studies in their Anthropology and Folk-Lore. (1891). Oxford: Clarendon Press. (full text from the Internet Archive).
 A Dictionary of the Language of Mota, Sugarloaf Island, Banks' Islands: With a short grammar and index. London: Society for Promoting Christian Knowledge.
 "Melanesians." Encyclopaedia of Religion and Ethics. Ed. James Hastings. Edinburgh: T. & T. Clark, 8:529–38.

References

External links

 
 Bibliography of works by or about Codrington from Project Canterbury

1830 births
1922 deaths
Anglican saints
People from Wroughton
19th-century English Anglican priests
20th-century English Anglican priests
English anthropologists
Ethnographers
20th-century Christian saints